"Beach House" is a song by Canadian singer-songwriter Carly Rae Jepsen, released August 5, 2022, by 604, Schoolboy, and Interscope Records as the second single from her sixth studio album The Loneliest Time. The song was written by Jepsen, Alex Hope, and Nate Cyphert, and produced by Hope and SameSame.

Style 
The New York Timess Lindsay Zoladz says that on the "cheeky earworm" "Beach House", "Jepsen employs her deadpan sense of humor as she lists off the red flags and deal-breakers that marred relationships with 'Boy No. 1' to 'Boy No. I Can't Keep Count Anymore'", "effectively tap[ping] into the romantic frustration of endless, Groundhog Day-esque first dates and long-term singledom." The Faders David Renshaw notes that the song "takes its title from a date idea by someone Jepsen explains she has matched with on an app" and includes the singer "detail[ing] the notoriously tumultuous landscape of Tinder et al", including "disappointment in a man whose mum made the picnic they ate together and another potential partner who, of course, turns out to be married", all centered on the chorus lyric "I got a beach house in Malibu and I'm probably gonna hurt your feelings". Mxdwn.coms Federico Cardenas notes that the chorus has backing vocals all sung by men.

In an interview with Cracks Ilana Kaplan, the writer described "Beach House" as "the antithesis of the soothing ambience of "Western Wind"", "one of the singer's most playful tracks", and "a campy pop anthem that finds Jepsen and her bandmates larping as boys going on bad dates." The song "features some of [Jepsen's] most absurd lyrics", with the singer saying "It was the shortest straw-pull for who had to sing, 'I've got a lake house in Canada, I'm going to come harvest your organs.'" Kaplan concludes that "while the track veers toward being lighthearted, there are harsh realities within it", with Jepsen saying "I wanted to highlight that feeling when you're disenchanted after [being on] a dating app for a hot minute to be like, 'That guy's just going to... he's going to wreck me.'"

Rankings

Personnel 
 Carly Rae Jepsen – lead vocals, songwriter
 Alex Hope – songwriter, producer, guitar, synthesizer, programming
 Nate Cyphert – songwriter, backing vocals
 Mitch McCarthy – recording and mixing engineer
 Chris Allgood and Emily Lazar – mastering engineers
 Rob Cohen – programming
 Ben Romans, Bobby Wooten, Jared Manierka, Joey Hendricks, and Tony Marino – backing vocals

Charts

References 

2022 singles
2022 songs
Carly Rae Jepsen songs
Songs written by Carly Rae Jepsen
Songs written by Alex Hope (songwriter)
604 Records singles
Schoolboy Records singles
Interscope Records singles
Canadian pop songs